Isaac Littlefeathers is a Canadian drama film, directed by Les Rose and released in 1984. The film stars William Korbut as the titular Isaac Littlefeathers, a young Métis boy in Edmonton who is struggling to establish his identity, having been raised by Jewish shopkeeper Abe Kapp (Lou Jacobi) ever since being abandoned by his parents (Scott Hylands and Michelle Thrush) in childhood.

The film had been in development since 1976, but Rose was unable to secure funding for the film until CBC Television committed to broadcast it in 1985 as part of its expanded program of independent production. The film had a brief theatrical run in 1984 in advance of its television premiere.

The film received five Genie Award nominations at the 6th Genie Awards in 1985, for Best Cinematography (Ed Higginson), Best Costume Design (Wendy Partridge), Best Overall Sound (David Appleby, Christopher Tate, Don White and Garrell Clark), Best Sound Editing (Michael O'Farrell and Peter Thilaye) and Best Original Score (Paul Zaza).

References

External links
 

1984 films
English-language Canadian films
1980s coming-of-age drama films
First Nations films
Films set in Edmonton
Films scored by Paul Zaza
Canadian coming-of-age drama films
Films directed by Les Rose
1980s English-language films
1980s Canadian films